Anarmodia bistralis is a moth in the family Crambidae. It was described by Achille Guenée in 1854. It is found in Colombia, Brazil, Venezuela and Ecuador.

References

Moths described in 1854
Spilomelinae
Moths of South America